The Best of Everclear is a greatest hits album by American alternative rock band Everclear. It was released on October 17, 2006 by Capitol Records. Notable exclusions from the album include "I Will Buy You a New Life" and "Father of Mine."

Rolling Stone and the Rock and Roll Hall of Fame voted Everclear one of the top 5 bands of the millennium in 2004.

Track listing
"Santa Monica" – 3:13
"Everything to Everyone" – 3:21
"Heartspark Dollarsign" – 2:53
"Brown Eyed Girl" – 4:22
"Sunflowers" – 3:49
"When It All Goes Wrong Again" – 3:49
"So Much for the Afterglow" – 3:55
"One Hit Wonder" – 3:30
"Out of My Depth" – 4:34
"Annabella's Song" – 4:55

Song origins
 Tracks 1 and 3 originally appeared on Sparkle and Fade (1995)
 Tracks 2, 5, 7, and 8 originally appeared on So Much for the Afterglow (1997)
 Tracks 4 and 10 originally appeared on Songs from an American Movie Vol. One: Learning How to Smile (2000)
 Tracks 6 and 9 originally appeared on Songs from an American Movie Vol. Two: Good Time for a Bad Attitude (2000)

External links
[ The Best of Everclear at AMG]

Everclear (band) compilation albums
Everclear, The Best of
Capitol Records compilation albums
Albums produced by Art Alexakis